StraitNZ (formerly Strait Shipping Limited and Bluebridge) is a New Zealand transport firm that operates roll-on/roll-off freight and passenger shipping across the Cook Strait, between Wellington in the North Island and Picton in the South Island, as well as trucking and logistics services across New Zealand.

Originally a freight-only service, passenger services commenced in 2002 and currently operate under the Bluebridge brand. As of 2021, Bluebridge holds 56% of the market for vehicle freight and 31% of the market for passenger services across Cook Strait.

The company was acquired on March 31, 2022 by Morgan Stanley Infrastructure Partners.

History 
The company has its origins in Otorohanga Transport, founded by Jim Barker and Dennis Dow in 1963. 

Inter-island ferry operations began in 1992 as Strait Shipping Limited, as a way for Barker to provide more affordable inter-island ferry services for his trucking group. Ferries between the North and South Islands of New Zealand were then monopolised by the Interisland Line, owned by the then state-owned enterprise New Zealand Rail Limited (renamed Tranz Rail in 1995). As of 2022, the two companies still hold a duopoly on interisland ferry services.

As well as operating across the Cook Strait between Wellington and Picton, Strait Shipping has in the past also operated freight shipping between Wellington and Napier, also in the North Island, and Nelson and Lyttelton in the South Island.

Bluebridge was launched as the passenger service brand of Strait Shipping in 2003.

In 2016, Strait Shipping was sold to Australian-based Champ Private Equity Group.  At the same time, Champ Group also purchased trucking companies Freight Lines and Streamline Freight, which had both been separately owned by the Barker family. At the time, the trucking and ferry companies owned by the Barker family were estimated to employ around 750 people. 

On 29 March 2018 Strait Shipping Limited was renamed StraitNZ, with passenger services continuing to operate under the Bluebridge brand. Sister companies Freight Lines and Streamline  were rebranded as "StraitNZ Linehaul" and "StraitNZ Freight Forwarding" respectively. That year, a 25% stake in the company was acquired by Macquarie.

In December 2021, the StraitNZ Group was sold by Champ Private Equity and Macquarie to Morgan Stanley Infrastructure Partners, for a reported sale price of NZ$500 million. The acquisition was completed in March 2022.

As of 2021, StraitNZ’s Bluebridge ferry unit was reported to have a 56% market share for Cook Strait vehicle freight, and a 31% market share for passenger services. The remaining share is held by Interislander, a subsidiary of New Zealand Government-owned KiwiRail.

Fleet

Current fleet

Historic fleet

References

External links
StraitNZ website
 Bluebridge website

2022 mergers and acquisitions

Ferry companies of New Zealand
Companies based in Wellington
Cook Strait Ferry
Picton, New Zealand
Transport companies of New Zealand
New Zealand companies established in 1992
Transport companies established in 1992